Marisol Malaret Contreras (October 13, 1949 – March 19, 2023) was a Puerto Rican television host, model, and beauty queen. In 1970 she was the first Caribbean and Puerto Rican woman to be crowned Miss Universe.

Biography
Malaret was born in Utuado, Puerto Rico on October 13, 1949. She started to work from an early age due to the death of her father and chronic illness of her mother. She was reportedly persuaded by Puerto Rican make-up artist Carmen Andino to compete in the Miss Puerto Rico pageant, then owned by Puerto Rican modeling guru and businesswoman Anna Santisteban. Malaret's strong will, ethics, and beauty made her a crowd favorite in the local contest. Before winning, she worked as an executive secretary for the Puerto Rico Telephone Company.

Malaret had one brother Jesús, and five half-siblings Joseph, Alicia, Rita, Antonio, and Raul. Her parents were Lydia Contreras and José Antonio Malaret. She was married three times; to former male model Butch James, musician Corky Stroman, with whom she had her only child Sasha, and Cuban-born engineer Frank Cué.

Malaret died on March 19, 2023, at age 73.

Miss Universe 1970
The auburn-haired, blue-green-eyed Malaret won the title on July 11, 1970, at the Miami Beach Auditorium in Miami Beach, Florida.

After her win in the Miss Universe pageant, she was honored with what was considered until then one of the biggest welcomings ever at San Juan's Isla Verde International Airport. The New York Times reported that "50,000 turned out in San Juan to honor a Queen."

Malaret's face graced the covers of many international and Puerto Rican entertainment and gossip magazines, such as Vea, Teve Guía, Artistas, Estrellas, and its smaller version Estrellitas. She participated in many advertising campaigns, and performed occasionally as a motivational speaker to young women and aspiring business leaders.

See also

List of Puerto Ricans
French immigration to Puerto Rico
List of television presenters
History of women in Puerto Rico

References

External links
 

1949 births
2023 deaths
Miss Puerto Rico winners
Miss Universe 1970 contestants
Miss Universe winners
People from Utuado, Puerto Rico
Puerto Rican beauty pageant winners
Puerto Rican female models
Puerto Rican people of French descent
OTI Festival presenters